Francis Coke  was an Anglican clergyman.

Coke was born in Trusley and educated at St John's College, Cambridge.  He was Archdeacon of Stafford from 6 December 1660 until his death on 4 May 1682.

References 

Category:People from Derbyshire (before 1895)

Alumni of St John's College, Cambridge
17th-century English Anglican priests
Archdeacons of Stafford
1682 deaths